Parliamentary elections were held in Finland on 20 and 21 March 1966. The Social Democratic Party (SDP) overtook the Centre Party as the largest faction in Parliament. Rafael Paasio of the SDP subsequently became Prime Minister and formed a popular front government consisting of the SDP, the Centre Party, the People's Democratic League (SKDL), and the Social Democratic Union of Workers and Smallholders (TPSL) in May 1966.

Background
Prior to the elections, Centre Party Prime Minister Johannes Virolainen had led a centre-right coalition government since September 1964. Meanwhile, Paasio had moved the SDP further to the left in order to attract back voters from the TPSL. Finnish society was undergoing a period of radical criticism of traditional values, such as Christianity, marriage, parents' authority over their children, teachers' authority over their students, patriotism, and civil servants' (including judges') authority over private citizens. The Social Democrats and the SKDL tapped into this discontent at the expense of the centre-right coalition. At the same time, leading Social Democrats, such as former Minister of Social Affairs and Minister of the Interior Väinö Leskinen, had promised to support President Kekkonen's foreign policy with regards to the Soviet Union, and his continuance as President.

Results
Overall, the leftist coalition achieved a combined majority (51.0%) of the votes cast in the election.

References

General elections in Finland
Finland
Parliament
Finland
Election and referendum articles with incomplete results